The 2S22 Bohdana is a 155 mm NATO-standard artillery caliber, wheeled self-propelled howitzer developed in Ukraine. It is mounted on the chassis of the Ukrainian six-wheel-drive KrAZ-6322 truck. It has an armoured double cabin and storage for around 20 shells. The howitzer has a minimum range of 780 meters, and a maximum range of 40 km with HE/AP ammunition or 50 km with a rocket-assisted projectile. It has an average rate of fire of six shells per minute.

History
The howitzer underwent live-fire tests in 2018. Its first public display was in the Kyiv Independence Day Parade on 24 August 2018. Test firings were conducted at the Shirokiy Lan training ground in May 2021. Further test firings were carried out at a range in Odesa Oblast in December 2021 and January 2022, where 450 shots were fired at a range of 42 km, greater than the manufacturer's specification of 40 km.

On 25 February, at the start of the 2022 Russian invasion of Ukraine, the Bohdana's manufacturers were ordered to destroy the sole prototype, to prevent the Russians from capturing it. However, it was able to be moved away from the Russians and handed to the Ukrainian Armed Forces. On 7 May 2022 Forbes reported that the prototype had been deployed at the front and was firing at Russian targets. 

In June 2022 Ukrainian forces on the mainland of Ukraine reportedly used the 2S22 Bohdana to shell Russian forces on Snake Island, which is 35 km from the mainland. This along with strikes from other artillery systems as well as drones led to the withdrawal of Russian forces from the island on 30 June.

In January 2023, the 2S22 entered full production. The first units will be delivered in the next few months.

See also

Archer
ATMOS 2000
A-222 Bereg
CAESAR
DANA
G6 Rhino
AHS Kryl
Nora B-52
PCL-09
PCL-161
PCL-181
PLL-09
Type 19 
ZUZANA

References 

Wheeled self-propelled howitzers
155 mm artillery
Self-propelled howitzers of Ukraine
Military vehicles introduced in the 2010s